Nikolai Vasilyevich Sklifosovsky (— ) was a Russian surgeon and physiologist of Moldavian origin. He was born near the town of Dubasari, which is now in Transnistria. Sklifosovsky was a professor of medicine in Saint Petersburg, Kiev, and Moscow. He was a founder of the «Clinical Town» at Devichye Pole.

Legacy

The Moscow Institute of Emergency First Aid, often abbreviated as Sklif, has borne his name since 1923.

In 1870, on the recommendation of Pirogov, another prominent Russian surgeon, Sklifosovsky was invited to head the department of surgery at Kyiv University. However, he did not stay in Kyiv for long: soon he went to war again, this time to the theater of the Franco-Prussian war.

About 10,000 wounded passed through Sklifosovskyi. The doctors and nurses, among whom was the surgeon's wife Sofya Oleksandrivna, supported Mykola Vasyliovych's strength by occasionally pouring a few sips of wine into his mouth between separate operations.

In 2001 the Central Bank of Transnistria arranged for the minting of a silver coin featuring this native of today's Transnistria, as part of a series of commemorative coins honoring The Outstanding People of Pridnestrovie.

References

1836 births
1904 deaths
People from Dubăsari
People from Kherson Governorate
Surgeons from the Russian Empire
Russian physiologists
Russian inventors
20th-century Russian scientists
19th-century scientists from the Russian Empire
Professorships at the Imperial Moscow University
Imperial Moscow University alumni